Caribbean Connection is a compilation album by various dancehall and reggaeton artists, presented by Machete Music. It was released on 24 June 2008.

Track listing

Charts

References

2008 compilation albums
Machete Music compilation albums
Reggae compilation albums